The Church of St Mary the Virgin in Isle Abbotts, Somerset, England dates from the 13th century with several restorations since. It has been designated as a Grade I listed building.

It has a tower of four stages. The embattled parapet is pierced by quatrefoils, the merlons pierced with lancet openings. The very large corner pinnacles have attached secondary pinnacles, and intermediate pinnacles to each side. The crocketted niches to each face of tower have surviving medieval figures, to west the risen Christ stepping from His sarcophagus, the Blessed Virgin with Bambino, St Peter and St Paul; to south St George, St Catherine, St Margaret; to east St John Baptist, St Clement; to north St Michael. The wealth of architectural detail and sculpture has required specific approaches to the methodology of repair and protection using lime-based materials. On the stonework are hunky punks which have been severely damaged by the weather, however one appears to be a person playing bagpipes.

See also

 List of Grade I listed buildings in South Somerset
 List of towers in Somerset
 List of ecclesiastical parishes in the Diocese of Bath and Wells

References

Church of England church buildings in South Somerset
13th-century church buildings in England
Grade I listed churches in Somerset
Grade I listed buildings in South Somerset